Littlewoods Mail Order Stores v Inland Revenue Commissioners [1969] 1 WLR 1241 is a UK company law case concerning piercing the corporate veil.

Facts
The facts were summarised by Lord Denning MR, in his judgment.

Littlewoods was complaining that the whole rent of £42,450 was deductible as an expense wholly for the purpose of trade under s 137 Income Tax Act 1952. The Commissioners rejected this. Plowman J held that the rent payments by Littlewoods were of a revenue character and properly deductible, but relying on a case that was soon reversed by the House of Lords.

Judgment
Sachs LJ and Karminski LJ held that FM’s interposition made no difference to the real nature of the payments, the transfers were not ‘money wholly and exclusively laid out’ for the purpose of trade and not deductible. For the purpose of annual expenditure the courts must look to the true nature of the transaction. Lord Denning MR held more broadly that the wholly owned subsidiary was not in this case a separate legal entity.

See also

UK company law

Notes

References

United Kingdom company case law
Court of Appeal (England and Wales) cases
1969 in case law
1969 in British law
Lord Denning cases